Curtis LeRoy Hansen (born April 18, 1933) is an inactive Senior United States district judge of the United States District Court for the District of New Mexico.

Education and career

Hansen was born in Audubon County, Iowa. He received a Bachelor of Science degree from University of Iowa in 1956. He moved to Albuquerque to work at Sandia National Laboratories on the nuclear weapons project. Hansen received a Juris Doctor from University of New Mexico School of Law in 1961. He was the first editor-in-chief of the Natural Resources Journal. He was a law clerk for the Judge Irwin S. Moise of the New Mexico Supreme Court from 1961 to 1962. He was in private practice of law in Albuquerque, New Mexico from 1962 to 1992.

Federal judicial service

Hansen was nominated by President George H. W. Bush on March 20, 1992, to the United States District Court for the District of New Mexico, to a new seat created by 104 Stat. 5089. He was confirmed by the United States Senate on September 25, 1992, and received his commission on October 2, 1992. He assumed senior status on April 18, 2003.

References

Sources
 
 Leroy C. Hansen, interview with State Bar of New Mexico.
 Senior District Judge, District of New Mexico Website.

1933 births
Living people
Judges of the United States District Court for the District of New Mexico
United States district court judges appointed by George H. W. Bush
20th-century American judges
University of Iowa alumni
University of New Mexico School of Law alumni
People from Audubon County, Iowa
Sandia National Laboratories people
21st-century American judges